C.S.I Jayaraj Annapackiam College, is a general degree college located in Nallur, Tenkasi district, Tamil Nadu. It was established in the year 1997. The college is affiliated with Manonmaniam Sundaranar University. This college offers different courses in arts, commerce and science.

The college is  recognized by the University Grants Commission (UGC).

See also
Education in India
Literacy in India
List of educational institutions in Tirunelveli district
List of institutions of higher education in Tamil Nadu

References

External links
http://csijac.edu.in/index.php

Educational institutions established in 1998
1998 establishments in Tamil Nadu
Colleges affiliated to Manonmaniam Sundaranar University
Universities and colleges in Tirunelveli district